Ghislain Printant (born 13 May 1961) is a French football manager, who is the currently assistant manager Ligue 1 club Montpellier.

On 30 January 2017, he was hired as an assistant coach for Jean-Louis Gasset with AS Saint-Étienne. After Gasset announced his retirement 2019, Printant was named as the manager. He was sacked 8 games into the season with Saint-Étienne in the relegation zone.

References

1961 births
Sportspeople from Montpellier
Living people
French football managers
SC Bastia managers
Ligue 1 managers